Colin Nixon (born 8 September 1978) is a retired footballer from Northern Ireland Who is currently the Technical Director of Glentoran Academy. Son of Alice and Hugh Nixon, Colin has a large football related family and has three children. His family are synonymous with the local game.

Playing career
Nixon is the son of Hugh and Alice Nixon, and has five siblings and three children. Colin played for Glentoran for all of his professional career. He has mainly played at right back but can also play centre back. He is a Glentoran supporter, and a fan's favourite. 'Nicky' is Glentoran's record appearance holder with over 700 appearances, the 700th coming in November 2010 against Portadown at Shamrock Park.

At the end of the 2012/13 Danske Bank Premiership season, Nixon was informed that he would not have his contract renewed. In his last game at The Oval, after making 792 appearances and scoring on 87 occasions - Nicky added one to each of those stats, replacing Jay Magee in the second half and scoring a spectacular acrobatic equaliser after 88 minutes to the delight of every fan in attendance. Nixon received a standing ovation before, during and after the game as the Glentoran fans paid tribute to a true club legend.

Colin Nixon came on for Glentoran in his final match, the 2013 Irish Cup Final which Glentoran won 3-1.  He lifted the cup alongside goalkeeper Elliott Morris who was Glentoran Captain for the day.

Managerial career
Nixon is no longer the manager of NIFL Premiership side Ards.

Honours
Glentoran
IFA Premiership (4): 1998–99, 2002–03, 2004–05, 2008–09
Irish Cup (6): 1996, 1998, 2000, 2001, 2004 2013
Irish League Cup (5): 2001,2003, 2005, 2007, 2010
County Antrim Shield (7): 1999, 2000, 2001, 2002, 2003, 2008, 2011

References

External links
Colin Nixon at Footballdatabase

Association football fullbacks
Glentoran F.C. players
NIFL Premiership players
Association footballers from Belfast
1978 births
Living people
Irish League representative players
Northern Ireland under-21 international footballers
Bangor F.C. players
Larne F.C. players
Association footballers from Northern Ireland
Football managers from Northern Ireland
Ards F.C. managers